Bossiaea saxosa is a species of flowering plant in the family Fabaceae and is endemic to a restricted area near Norseman, Western Australia. It is an erect, intricately branched shrub with many slightly flattened, sharply-pointed cladodes and deep yellow, red and lemon-yellow, pea-like flowers.

Description
Muelleria 23: |journal=Muelleria |date=2006 |volume=11 |pages=129–130 |url=https://www.biodiversitylibrary.org/item/278250#page/131/mode/1up |access-date=31 August 2021}}</ref>

Taxonomy and namingBossiaea saxosa was first formally described in 1994 by James Henderson Ross in the journal Muelleria from specimens he collected near Norseman in 2000. The specific epithet (saxosa) means "of rocky or stony places".

Distribution and habitat
This bossiaea is only known from a small area north of Norseman where it grows in woodland.

Conservation statusBossiaea saxosa'' is classified as "Priority One" by the Government of Western Australia Department of Biodiversity, Conservation and Attractions, meaning that it is known from only one or a few locations which are potentially at risk.

References

saxosa
Mirbelioids
Flora of Western Australia
Plants described in 2006